The Bridge of Flowers is in Shelburne Falls, Massachusetts, connecting the towns of Shelburne and Buckland. The seasonal footbridge – once a trolley bridge – has a garden of flowers covering it. It is only open between April and October.

As a trolley bridge 

Built for $20,000 in 1908 by the Shelburne Falls and Colrain Street Railway so that freight could be picked up and dropped off directly from the railroads and brought to Colrain. This concrete bridge was necessary because the nearby Iron Bridge had a twenty-ton weight limit. The Iron Bridge – a truss bridge built in 1890 – is still open to vehicles. The two bridges' ends in Buckland are almost side by side.

As automobile usage began to increase, freight began to be transported more by trucks, and the street railway (trolley) company went bankrupt in 1927. The history of the railway is preserved in the Shelburne Falls Trolley Museum.

As a garden 

In 1929, with the bridge covered in weeds, local housewife Antoinette Burnham came up with the idea of transforming the bridge into a garden. Since it was not needed as a footbridge and could not be demolished because it carried a water main between the two towns, the community agreed to her idea. The Shelburne Woman's Club sponsored the project in 1928. In 1929, eighty loads of loam and several loads of fertilizer were brought to the bridge. Several women's clubs around town raised $1,000 in 1929.

In 1975, a photographic study was conducted of Shelburne Falls. One of the concerns of the town was the deterioration of the bridge structure. In 1981, funds were raised by those who owned the bridge, and a study was commissioned. The study determined that $580,000 in repairs should be made to the bridge. Various organizations raised money and repairs began on May 2, 1983. During the restoration, every plant that was removed was cared for in private. The restoration replaced the 8-inch water line, which carries up to half a million gallons of water a day. The bridge also contains two and a half feet of soil at the top of the arches and nine feet deep at the piers.

On August 28, 2011, rain runoff from Hurricane Irene (at that point a tropical storm) flooded the Deerfield River and engulfed the Bridge of Flowers.

References

External links

 

Bridges completed in 1908
Deck arch bridges in the United States
Bridges in Franklin County, Massachusetts
Tourist attractions in Franklin County, Massachusetts
Railroad bridges in Massachusetts
1908 establishments in Massachusetts
Shelburne, Massachusetts
Buckland, Massachusetts
Pedestrian bridges in Massachusetts
Linear parks